Sir David William Evans (4 November 1866 – 17 March 1926) was a Welsh lawyer and public servant, who played a leading role in the fight against tuberculosis in Wales. In his early adult life, Evans was a very keen sportsman and played rugby union for Oxford University and Cardiff. He played five international matches for Wales national rugby union team between 1889 and 1891.

Life
Evans was born at Dowlais, Merthyr Tydfil, Wales, his father (Thomas Evans) being a merchant and musician.  Evans was educated at Llandovery School and Jesus College, Oxford, matriculating in 1885.  He won his "Blue" at rugby in 1887 and 1888, but the Cambridge University team won on both occasions. He played for the Wales national rugby union team against the Irish and Scottish teams in 1889, and against the English and Irish teams in 1890 and 1891. He was admitted as a solicitor in 1893, and practised in Cardiff.  

In 1913, he was appointed as director and legal advisor of the King Edward VII National Memorial Association for the Prevention and Treatment of Tuberculosis; his obituary in The Times said that his "keenness and energy" in this role "unquestionably had far-reaching effects on the health of the Principality". 

He was also a member of the council of the Cardiff Royal Infirmary, the Prince of Wales's Hospital, the Nursing Association, the National Eisteddfod Association, the National Council of Music, and the Ministry of Health Consultative Council for Wales. He was knighted in 1925 "for public services in Wales".  

Shortly before his death, he was installed as Master of the Hendre Lodge of Freemasons. He died in Cardiff on 17 March 1926, having been suffering with a heart condition for some time that had required him to spend the previous four months away from work.

References 

1866 births
1926 deaths
Alumni of Jesus College, Oxford
Barbarian F.C. players
Cardiff RFC players
Knights Bachelor
Lawyers awarded knighthoods
London Welsh RFC players
Oxford University RFC players
Rugby union forwards
Rugby union players from Merthyr Tydfil County Borough
Wales international rugby union players
Welsh rugby union players
Welsh solicitors